LaFayette Emmett (May 8, 1822 – August 10, 1905) was an American lawyer and an early leader in Minnesota law. He was the second attorney general of the Minnesota Territory from 1853 to 1858 and the first chief justice of the state supreme court, serving from 1858 to 1865.

Early life
Emmett was born and raised in Ohio, died in Santa Fe, New Mexico, and was buried in Faribault, Minnesota. He had nine children and was the father-in-law of Miguel Antonio Otero, who was governor of the New Mexico Territory from 1897 to 1906. His brother Dan_Emmett is known for composing "Dixie".

Career
In the divided convention which drafted the Minnesota Constitution, he served as a Democrat and advocated the popular election of judges, a position that was adopted. He said, "if the people are incapable of selecting their judges, they are also incapable of selecting the man who is to appoint the judges."

References

1822 births
1905 deaths
Chief Justices of the Minnesota Supreme Court
Minnesota state court judges
Minnesota Attorneys General
Minnesota Territory officials
Minnesota Democrats
19th-century American judges